Allium tekesicola is a plant species endemic to the Ili River Basin in Xinjiang and Kazakhstan.

Allium tekesicola produces one or occasionally 2 bulbs, each up to 10 mm across. Scape is up to 60 cm tall, round in cross-section. Leaves are shorter than the scape, very narrow. Umbels have only a few red flowers.

References

tekesicola
Onions
Flora of China
Flora of Xinjiang
Flora of Kazakhstan
Plants described in 1887